A Corliss steam engine (or Corliss engine) is a steam engine, fitted with rotary valves and with variable valve timing patented in 1849, invented by and named after the American engineer George Henry Corliss of Providence, Rhode Island. The principal novelty was the application of pulse width modulation to regulate the flow of steam.

Engines fitted with Corliss valve gear offered the best thermal efficiency of any type of stationary steam engine until the refinement of the uniflow steam engine and steam turbine in the 20th century.  Corliss engines were generally about 30 percent more fuel efficient than conventional steam engines with fixed cutoff. This increased efficiency made steam power more economical than water power, allowing industrial development away from millponds.

Corliss engines were typically used as stationary engines to provide mechanical power to line shafting in factories and mills and to drive dynamos to generate electricity.  Many were quite large, standing many metres tall and developing several hundred horsepower, albeit at low speed, turning massive flywheels weighing several tons at about 100 revolutions per minute.  Some of these engines have unusual roles as mechanical legacy systems and because of their relatively high efficiency and low maintenance requirements, some remain in service into the early 21st century.  See, for example, the engines at the Hook Norton Brewery and the Distillerie Dillon in the list of operational engines.

Corliss engine mechanisms

Corliss engines have four valves for each cylinder, with steam and exhaust valves located at each end.  Corliss engines incorporate distinct refinements in both the valves themselves and in the valve gear, that is, the system of linkages that operate the valves.

The use of separate valves for steam admission and exhaust means that neither the valves nor the steam passages between cylinders and valves need to change temperature during the power and exhaust cycle, and it means that the timing of the admission and exhaust valves can be independently controlled.  In contrast, conventional steam engines have a slide valve or piston valve that alternately feeds and exhausts through passages to each end of the cylinder.  These passages are exposed to wide temperature swings during engine operation, and there are high temperature gradients within the valve mechanism. The valve timing of intake and exhaust of a slide valve can be independently controlled, but only during engine design through the shape of the slider and only one fixed timing regime is then repeated on each stroke of the engine. The only means to control engine power of such conventional steam engines during operation is to regulate the flow rate of the steam that enters the intake valve.

Clark (1891) commented that the Corliss gear "is essentially a combination of elements previously known and used separately, affecting the cylinder and the valve-gear". The origins of the Corliss gear with regard to previous steam valve gear was traced by Inglis (1868).

Corliss valve gear

George Corliss received  for his valve gear on March 10, 1849.  This patent covered the use of a wrist-plate to convey the valve motion from a single eccentric to the four valves of the engine, and it covered the use of trip valves with variable cutoff under governor control that characterize Corliss Engines. Unlike later engines, most of which were horizontal, this patent describes a vertical cylinder beam engine, and it used individual slide valves for admission and exhaust at each end of the cylinder.

The inlet valves are pulled open with an eccentric-driven pawl; when the pawl trips, the rapid closure is damped using a dashpot.  In many engines, the same dashpot acts as a vacuum spring to pull the valves closed, but Corliss's early engines were slow enough that it was the weight of the dashpot piston and rod that closed the valve.

The speed of a Corliss engine is controlled by varying the cutoff of steam during each power stroke, while leaving the throttle wide open at all times.  To accomplish this, the centrifugal governor is linked to a pair of cams, one for each admission valve.  These cams determine the point during the piston stroke that the pawl will release, allowing that valve to close.

As with all steam engines where the cutoff can be regulated, the virtue of doing so lies in the fact that most of the power stroke is powered by the expansion of steam in the cylinder after the admission valve has closed.  This comes far closer to the ideal Carnot cycle than is possible with an engine where the admission valve is open for the length of the power stroke and speed is regulated by a throttle valve. This efficiency gain depends on the duration of the admission of steam. A Corliss engine running at the maximum power output of a conventional engine with the same cylinder diameter and stroke (when no throttle is applied) must have the same valve timing and their thermodynamic properties are the same.

The Corliss valve gearing allowed more uniform speed and better response to load changes, making it suitable for applications like rolling mills and spinning, and greatly expanding its use in manufacturing.

Corliss valves
 

Corliss valves open directly into the cylinder.  The valves connect the cylinder to separate steam and exhaust plenums.  Initially, Corliss used slide valves with linear actuators, but by 1851, Corliss had shifted to semi-rotary valve actuators, as documented in U.S. Patent 8253.  In this engine, the wrist plate was moved to the center of the cylinder side, as on later Corliss engines.  This was still a beam engine, however, and the semi-rotary valve actuators operated linear slide valves inside the four valve chests of the engine.

Corliss valves are in the form of a minor circular segment, rotating inside a cylindrical valve-face. Their actuating mechanism is off along the axis of the valve, thus they have little "dead space" such as the stem of a poppet valve and the entire port area can be used efficiently for gas flow.

As the area of a Corliss valve is small compared to the port area, the effects of gas flow generate relatively little torque on the valve axle compared to some other sorts of valve. These advantages have led to the Corliss form of valve being used in other roles, apart from steam engines with Corliss gear.

The Rolls-Royce Merlin aero-engine used a rectangular butterfly valve as a throttle. Gas-flow forces acting asymmetrically on this butterfly could lead to poor control of the power in some circumstances. Late models, from the 134, used a Corliss throttle valve instead to avoid this problem.

Barring and barring engines
A common feature of large Corliss engines is one or two sets of narrow gear teeth in the rim of the flywheel. These teeth allow the flywheel to be barred, that is, turned with the aid of a crowbar.  This may be needed during engine maintenance, for example, to set the cutoff and admission valve timing, and it may be needed during engine starting.

The need for barring the engine during starting is most obvious on single-cylinder engines, where a careless engine operator might stop the engine with the piston in or near dead center.  Once stopped in this state, the engine cannot be started under its own power, so it must be barred to a more favorable position for starting.

Large Corliss engines cannot be safely started cold, so it is common to admit low-pressure steam to both sides of the cylinder to warm up the metalwork. Turning the engine slowly during this process ensures that the entire engine is uniformly warmed, and it ensures that oil is uniformly distributed through the mechanism before applying power. Again, barring may be used to do this, although operators sometimes do this by careful manual manipulation of the valves.

For large engines, muscle powered barring is sufficiently difficult that barring engines are frequently installed.  These are small engines with gear teeth cut to mate with the teeth on the flywheel.  Generally, the drive gears of the barring engine are designed to automatically disengage if the engine begins running under its own power while the barring gears are engaged.

Company history
The Corliss Steam Engine Company was originally known as Fairbanks, Clark & Co. in the 1830s. In 1843 it was renamed Fairbanks, Bancroft & Co. when Edward Bancroft joined the company. In 1846 it was renamed Bancroft, Nightingale & Co. when George H. Corliss joined the company, and in 1847 it was renamed Corliss, Nightingale and Co. In 1848 the company moved to the Charles Street Railroad Crossing in Providence, Rhode Island.

In 1857 the company was renamed for the last time to Corliss Steam Engine Company. By 1864 Corliss bought out his partners and was the sole owner of the company. In 1900 the Corliss Steam Engine Company was purchased by the International Power Company. In 1905 it was purchased by the American and British Manufacturing Company. In 1925 the company merged into Franklin Machine Company. By then Franklin Machine Company was already owned by the William A. Harris Steam Engine Company.

By 1859, all of the key features of what we now know as the Corliss engine were in place. Patents granted to Corliss and others incorporated rotary valves and crank shafts in-line with the cylinders. See, for example, Corliss' U.S. Patent 24,618, granted July 5, 1859. Competing inventors worked hard to invent alternatives to Corliss' mechanisms; they generally avoided Corlis's use of a wrist plate and adopted alternative releasing mechanisms for the steam valves, as in Jamieson's U.S. Patent 19,640, granted March 16, 1858.

Corliss' 1849 patent expired in 1870; the term of this patent had been extended by U.S. Patent reissue 200 on May 13, 1851, and U.S. Patent reissues 758 and 763 on July 12, 1859. B. Hick and Son were first to introduce the Corliss engine into the United Kingdom about 1864. After 1870, numerous other companies began to manufacture Corliss engines. Among them, the William A. Harris Steam Engine Company, the Worthington Pump and Machinery Company, and Allis-Chalmers. In general, these machines were referred to as Corliss engines regardless of who made them.

Centennial Engine
The Corliss Centennial Engine was an all-inclusive, specially built rotative beam engine that powered virtually all of the exhibits at the Centennial Exposition in Philadelphia in 1876 through shafts totaling over a mile in length. Switched on by President Ulysses S. Grant and Emperor Pedro II of Brazil, the engine was in public view for the duration of the fair.

The engine was configured as two cylinders side by side. After the fair it was disassembled and shipped back to Corliss's plant in Providence. Seven years later it was sold and powered a Chicago factory owned by George Pullman until 1910, when it was sold as scrap.

This engine became a cultural icon, so much so that to many modern historians the term Corliss Engine (or Corliss Steam Engine) refers to this specific engine and not to the broad class of engines fitted with Corliss valve gear.

List of operational engines

Notable people
 

William Wright (engineer)

See also

 Corliss Steam Engine (Pawnee, Oklahoma)
 Piston valve
 Poppet valve
 Sleeve valve
 Slide valve
 Steam locomotive nomenclature
 Trip valve gear
 Valve gear
 Variable valve timing

References

 Popular Mechanics Monthly Magazine of April 1907, commented on page 416, near the bottom right of the page, the Corliss Engine can be made to do more work by raising the boiler pressure, increasing the speed or giving less laps to the steam valves.

External links

Chapter 14 of Audel's Engineer's and Mechanic's Guide by Frank D. Graham.
Corliss History from the New England Wireless and Steam Museum.
Corliss Steam Engine Basics from the Stationary Steam Preservation web pages of the Camp Creek Threshers.
Corliss Steam Engine Co. Centennial Engine images at the New England Wireless and Steam Museum website.
Denton Farm Park, Denton North Carolina
SCIENTIFIC AMERICAN SUPPLEMENT NO. 286 NEW YORK, JUNE 25, 1881: 1000 hp Corliss Engine The Saltaire Engine, a Hick Hargreaves engine with illustrations.

Engine valves
Stationary steam engines
Steam engines
History of the steam engine
Articles containing video clips